Julius Euting (11 July 1839 – 2  January 1913) was a German Orientalist.

Life

Director of the National and University Library of Strasbourg, he completed his first studies at the Eberhard-Ludwigs-Gymnasium in Stuttgart and at the local seminary . He then studied Theology and Oriental Languages ​​in Tübingen from 1857 to 1861.

Starting in 1867, he made numerous trips to Near and Middle East, especially Syria and Arabia. He worked on the Quran and published numerous bibliographic catalogs. He also published a tourist work on Strasbourg in 1903. He feigned a conversion to Islam, and, just like his colleague Christiaan Snouck Hurgronje, adopted an Arabic name, ʿAbd al-Wahhāb.

From 1876 to 1912 he was President of the Vogesenclub (in French Club Vosgien), on which he wrote a history.
This association paid homage to him by dedicating the Tower overlooking the Climont to his name.

Selected works
 Qolastā oder Gesänge und Lehren von der Taufe und dem Ausgang der Seele. Stuttgart, 1867.
 Beschreibung der Stadt Strassburg und des Munsters, Strasbourg, 1881.
 Tagebuch einer Reise in Inner-Arabien, reprint of the 1896 and 1914 Leiden edition, edited by Enno Littmann, Leiden, 1914 [Reprints u.a. Hildesheim, 2004, ISBN 3-487-12616-8.
 Katalog der Kaiserlichen Universitäts- und Landesbibliothek in Strassburg: Arabische Literatur. Strassburg 1877 (online).
 Nabatäische Inschriften aus Arabien, Berlin, 1885 (online).
 Sinaïtische Inschriften, Berlin, 1891 (online).

Notes

Bibliography 
 Hélène Lozachmeur et Françoise Briquel-Chatonnet, "Charles Huber und Julius Euting in Arabien nach französischen, auch heute noch nicht veröffentlichten Dokumenten", Anabases, n. 12, 2010, pp. 195–200.
 C. J. Lyall, «Julius Euting», in The Journal of the Royal Asiatic Society of Great Britain and Ireland (Cambridge), April 1913, pp. 505–510 (necrology).

1913 deaths
1839 births
People from Stuttgart
University of Tübingen alumni
Academic staff of the University of Copenhagen
German Arabists
German orientalists
Explorers of Asia
Explorers of Arabia
Academic staff of the University of Strasbourg
Members of the Prussian Academy of Sciences
Members of the Académie des Inscriptions et Belles-Lettres
Scholars of Mandaeism